John Munn may refer to:
 John Munn (Manitoba politician) (1882–1941), Manitoba veterinarian and politician
 John Munn (shipbuilder) (1788–1859), shipbuilder and politician in Lower Canada
 John Munn (Newfoundland politician) (1807–1879), Newfoundland businessman and politician
 John C. Munn - United States Marine Corps general officer
 John Shannon Munn (1880–1918), Newfoundland businessman and first-class cricketer